Penn Township is a township in Jefferson County, Iowa, USA.

The small city of Pleasant Plain and the former hamlet of Veo are within the geographic bounds of the township.

References

Townships in Jefferson County, Iowa
Townships in Iowa